The 2022 RFL Women's Super League (also known as the Betfred Women's Super League for sponsorship reasons) was the sixth season of the Rugby League Women's Super League, for female players in clubs affiliated to the Rugby Football League (RFL).

The title was won by Leeds Rhinos who beat York City Knights 12–4 in the grand final. York had finished top of the table to win the league leader's shield.

The defending champions were St Helens, who beat Leeds Rhinos 28–0 in the Grand Final at Headingley on 10 October 2021, in front of a record crowd of 4,235.

The league increased the number of participating teams by 2, from 10 to 12, with Barrow Raiders and Leigh Miners Rangers being promoted to the Super League, after finishing first and second respectively in the 2021 Women's Championship. However, the structure of the league has changed, with the league being split into two groups; a structure based on the play-off and shield structures used in the second half of the 2021 season. Group 1 comprises Huddersfield, Leeds, St Helens, Wigan and York.  Group 2 comprises Barrow, Bradford, Castleford, Leigh Miners, Featherstone, Wakefield and Warrington.  The RFL explained that the split structure as giving the player for clubs in group 1, challenging fixtures in the run-up to the World Cup; while allowing the clubs in group 2, the opportunity to develop by playing clubs in more competitive matches. However, in April 2022, the RFL acceded to a request from Castleford, for the club to be placed in Group 2, thus changing the structure, with Group 1 containing of five clubs and group 2 of seven clubs.

End of season awards
At the end of season awards on 24 September, three awards were made:
Woman of Steel: Tara-Jane Stanley (York City Knights)
Coach Of The Year: Lois Forsell (Leeds Rhinos)
Young player of the year: Hollie Dodd (York City Knights)

Teams

Group 1
  Huddersfield Giants
  Leeds Rhinos
  St Helens
  Wigan Warriors
  York City Knights

Group 2
  Barrow Raiders
  Bradford Bulls
  Castleford Tigers
  Featherstone Rovers
  Leigh Miners Rangers
  Wakefield Trinity
  Warrington Wolves

Fixtures and results

Regular season tables

Group 1

Group 2

Play-offs

The play-off structure for each group was the same; 1st v 4th and 2nd v 3rd in the semi-finals with the winners meeting in the final. In Group 1, the final known as the Grand Final would determine the champions for the season. In Group 2 the final was called the Shield Final and would determine which team was promoted to Group 1 for 2023. The finals were played as a double header at the Totally Wicked Stadium in St Helens.

Group 1
In the semi-finals York beat Wigan 12–4 and Leeds beat St Helens 14–6. Leeds beat York 12–4 in the Grand Final to take their second title.

Group 2
Warrington beat Bradford 72–0 while Featherstone beat Barrow 12–10 in the semi-finals. In the Shield Final, Warrington won 34–6 against Featherstone to be promoted to Group A.

References

RFL Women's Super League
Women's Super League
Women's Super League
Women's Super League